Balys is a Lithuanian masculine given name. People bearing the name Balys include:
Balys Dvarionas (1904—1972), Lithuanian composer, pianist, conductor, and educator
Balys Gajauskas (1926–2017), Lithuanian politician
Balys Macutkevičius (1905–1964), Lithuanian painter
Balys Sruoga (1896–1947), Lithuanian poet, playwright, critic, and literary theorist

References

Lithuanian masculine given names